= Punta del Agua, Catamarca =

Coordinates: 27.2250°S 67.7569°W

Punta del Agua (Catamarca)
- Municipality and village
- Interactive map of Punta del Agua (Catamarca)
- Country: Argentina
- Province: Catamarca Province
- Time zone: UTC−3 (ART)

Punta del Agua (Catamarca) is a village and municipality in Catamarca Province in northwestern Argentina.
